Philautus amoenus is a species of frog in the family Rhacophoridae. It is endemic to northern Borneo and known from Mount Kinabalu, Sabah, Malaysia.

Its natural habitats are submontane and montane forests. No direct threats to it have been identified, but its limited range makes it vulnerable to stochastic events.

References

External links
 

amoenus
Amphibians of Malaysia
Endemic fauna of Malaysia
Endemic fauna of Borneo
Amphibians described in 1931
Taxonomy articles created by Polbot